Mercy Akinyi Airo (born 20 October 1999) is a Kenyan footballer who plays as a forward for Kisumu All Starlets FC and the Kenya women's national team.

International career
Airo capped for Kenya at senior level during the 2019 CECAFA Women's Championship and the 2020 Turkish Women's Cup.

See also
List of Kenya women's international footballers

References

1999 births
Living people
People from Kisumu County
Kenyan women's footballers
Women's association football forwards
Kenya women's international footballers